Andoni Goikoetxea Olaskoaga (born 23 August 1956), Goiko for short, is a Spanish former football centre-back and manager.

He was known for his aggressive play and was nicknamed "The Butcher of Bilbao". He mainly played for Athletic Bilbao; among the club's fans, he was also known as El Gigante de Alonsotegui (The Giant of Alonsotegui).

Goikoetxea was a Spanish international in the 1980s. He won 39 caps, and represented the country in the 1986 World Cup and Euro 1984.

Playing career

Club
Born in Alonsotegi, Biscay, Goikoetxea began playing football with local Arbuyo before joining Athletic Bilbao in 1973 where, after starting out at the reserve side, he soon established himself in the senior team squad. He scored four La Liga goals in 27 games in his debut season, but played a lesser role in the following three years with a total of only 24 appearances.

During the 1980s, along with Dani, José Ramón Gallego, José Núñez, Manuel Sarabia and Andoni Zubizarreta, Goiko was a prominent member of the successful Bilbao side coached by Javier Clemente. In 1984 the Basque club renewed its league title, also achieving the double (league and Copa del Rey) in that year.

Maradona foul

On 24 September 1983, Goikoetxea achieved notoriety for a foul on Diego Maradona described as "one of the most brutal fouls ever delivered in the history of Spanish football". In a league match at the Camp Nou, he tackled the Argentine from behind and broke his ankle. Maradona compared the sound he heard to that of wood breaking and, in the aftermath, English journalist Edward Owen coined the phrase "Butcher of Bilbao" to describe Goikoetxea, a nickname which stayed with him for the rest of his career. Maradona's compatriot César Luis Menotti, the coach of FC Barcelona, accused the Spaniard of "belonging to a 'race of anti-footballers'" and called for a lifelong ban; he was served a ten-match ban by the Royal Spanish Football Federation. It was later reported he kept "the boot he had used to destroy...(Maradona's) ankle ligaments" at home in a glass case.

Two seasons earlier, Goikoetxea had severely injured Barcelona midfielder Bernd Schuster, leaving him with a serious right knee injury from which the German never fully recovered. When the two teams met in the 1984 Copa del Rey Final in May, the match ended 1–0 for Athletic. Featuring in a mass brawl on the pitch, he kicked Maradona's chest; he was initially banned for 18 games for his actions, but the suspension was later reduced to seven.

Later years
After three years with Atlético Madrid where he featured sparingly, Goikoetxea retired at almost 34 after appearing in 369 competitive matches for Athletic, netting 44 times.

International
Goikoetxea played 39 matches with Spain, making his debut against the Netherlands on 16 February 1983. He represented the nation at both UEFA Euro 1984 and the 1986 FIFA World Cup. During the latter competition he scored one of his four international goals, through a penalty in a round-of-16 5–1 win against Denmark – the remaining four came courtesy of Emilio Butragueño.

Coaching career
Goikoetxea became a coach two years after retiring, starting to work at club level in 1996 and going on to be in charge of UD Salamanca (twice), SD Compostela, CD Numancia (two spells), Racing de Santander and Rayo Vallecano. In the 1996–97 season he guided Salamanca to promotion from the Segunda División, finishing second. He was assistant with the Spain national team to his former manager Clemente, during the 1994 World Cup held in the United States.

In June 2007, Goikoetxea joined Alicante-based Hércules CF in the second tier, being released at the end of the campaign after being suspended by the club for implying its internal structures "stank". In late February 2013 he was appointed coach of Equatorial Guinea, being dismissed in January 2015 just three weeks before the start of the 2015 Africa Cup of Nations due to poor performance in friendlies, which included a loss to a lower league side in Portugal.

Style of play
Goikoetxea was notorious for his aggressive style of play, not least because of the two heavy fouls (see Maradona foul) on Maradona and Schuster which earned him the nickname "Butcher of Bilbao". In 2007, English newspaper The Times named him the "hardest defender of all time".

Career statistics

Club

International goals
Scores and results list Spain's goal tally first, score column indicates score after each Goikoetxea goal.

Honours

Player
Athletic Bilbao
La Liga: 1982–83, 1983–84
Copa del Rey: 1983–84
Supercopa de España: 1984

Spain
UEFA European Championship runner-up: 1984

Manager
Spain U21
UEFA European Under-21 Championship runner-up: 1996; third place 1994

References

External links

 
 
 
 
 

1956 births
Living people
People from Alonsotegi
Sportspeople from Biscay
Spanish footballers
Footballers from the Basque Country (autonomous community)
Association football defenders
La Liga players
Tercera División players
Bilbao Athletic footballers
Athletic Bilbao footballers
Atlético Madrid footballers
Spain youth international footballers
Spain under-21 international footballers
Spain amateur international footballers
Spain international footballers
UEFA Euro 1984 players
1986 FIFA World Cup players
Basque Country international footballers
Spanish beach soccer players
Spanish football managers
La Liga managers
Segunda División managers
Segunda División B managers
UD Salamanca managers
SD Compostela managers
CD Numancia managers
Racing de Santander managers
Rayo Vallecano managers
Hércules CF managers
AD Ceuta managers
Spain national under-21 football team managers
Equatorial Guinea national football team managers
Spanish expatriate football managers
Expatriate football managers in Equatorial Guinea
Spanish expatriate sportspeople in Equatorial Guinea